Endymion (minor planet designation: 342 Endymion) is a large Main belt asteroid. It was discovered by Max Wolf on 17 October 1892 in Heidelberg. It was the first asteroid to receive the name of a male god.

References

External links 
 
 

000342
Discoveries by Max Wolf
Named minor planets
000342
000342
18921017